Greek National Road 53 (abbr: EO53)  is a national highway of Greece. It connects Alexandroupoli with Ormenio on the Bulgarian border, passing through Aisymi, Mikro Dereio, Metaxades and Kyprinos.

References

53
Roads in Eastern Macedonia and Thrace